

Men's 50 m Breaststroke - Final

Men's 50 m Breaststroke - Semifinals

Men's 50 m Breaststroke - Semifinal 01

Men's 50 m Breaststroke - Semifinal 02

Men's 50 m Breaststroke - Heats

Men's 50 m Breaststroke - Heat 01

Men's 50 m Breaststroke - Heat 02

Men's 50 m Breaststroke - Heat 03

Men's 50 m Breaststroke - Heat 04

References 

Swimming at the 2006 Commonwealth Games